Michael Thomas Liburdi (born 1977) is a United States district judge of the United States District Court for the District of Arizona.

Education 

Liburdi received his Bachelor of Science, summa cum laude, from Arizona State University and his Juris Doctor, magna cum laude, from the Sandra Day O'Connor College of Law at Arizona State University.

Legal and academic career 

After graduating from law school, Liburdi served as a law clerk to vice chief justice Ruth McGregor of the Arizona Supreme Court. He later served as general counsel to Arizona governor Doug Ducey. From 2018–2019 he was a shareholder in the Phoenix, Arizona, office of Greenberg Traurig, where he served as chair of the Phoenix litigation practice. His practice focused on complex commercial and constitutional litigation, as well as campaign finance and election procedure compliance. Liburdi also serves as an adjunct professor of law at the Sandra Day O'Connor College of Law at Arizona State University, where he teaches election law.

Federal judicial service 

On January 16, 2019, President Donald Trump announced his intent to nominate Liburdi to serve as a United States district judge for the United States District Court for the District of Arizona. On January 17, 2019, his nomination was sent to the Senate. Trump nominated Liburdi to the seat vacated by judge David G. Campbell, who assumed senior status on July 31, 2018. On February 13, 2019, a hearing on his nomination was held before the Senate Judiciary Committee On March 7, 2019, his nomination was reported out of committee by a 12–10 vote. On July 29, 2019, the United States Senate voted 51–37 to invoke cloture on his nomination. On July 30, 2019, his nomination was confirmed by a 53–37 vote. He received his judicial commission on August 5, 2019.

Memberships 

Liburdi has been a member of the Federalist Society since 2005.

References

External links 
 

1977 births
Living people
20th-century American lawyers
21st-century American lawyers
21st-century American judges
American people of Italian descent
Arizona lawyers
Arizona State University alumni
Federalist Society members
Judges of the United States District Court for the District of Arizona
People from Scranton, Pennsylvania
Sandra Day O'Connor College of Law alumni
United States district court judges appointed by Donald Trump